Jwalshik Wilford (born September 3, 1968)  is a professional Nigerian chemist. He is the third substantive Registrar/Chief Executive Officer of the Institute of Chartered Chemists of Nigeria (ICCON); a parastatal of Federal Ministry of Health (FMoH) that regulates the teaching, learning and standard best practice of the Chemistry profession in Nigeria. As a professional, his major focus is the repositioning and projecting of the Chemistry profession to promote the role(s) of chemists in addressing global challenges. Before his appointment on 1 June 2018, he was a deputy director of the Federal Capital Territory (FCT) Water Board where he served most of his professional career. He is a Fellow of the Institute of Chartered Chemists of Nigeria (ICCON) and the Chemical Society of Nigeria (CSN). His research interests are in the areas of Water Safety, Contaminants of Emerging Concerns (CECs) in raw water sources and the distribution network and new methods of water analyses and treatment.

Early life and education 
Wilford was born in Bwonpe, Plateau State, Nigeria on 3 September 1968. He began and completed his primary education at Local Government Education Department Primary School, Bwonpe, Plateau State. He then proceeded to Nakam Memorial Secondary School, Panyam, Plateau State in 1981 where he obtained his General Certificate of Education (GCE) in 1986. After his secondary education, he gained admission into Abubakar Tafawa Balewa University (ATBU) Bauchi, where he earned a Bachelor of Technology degree in Industrial Chemistry in 1991. He obtained a master's degree in Analytical Chemistry from the University of Abuja in 2002.

Professional career 
As a practicing and professional chemist, he started his career as a scientific officer II on completion of his National Youth Service Corp with the FCT Water Board.  He had before then, earned a B.Tech. (Hons) degree in Industrial Chemistry, from Abubakar Tafawa Balewa University (ATBU) Bauchi in 1991 and a master's degree in Analytical Chemistry from University of Abuja in 2001. He has since risen to the rank of deputy director, having served in various capacities.

His passion and interest in promoting chemistry professionally has seen him serve in various capacities within the Chemical Society of Nigeria and the Institute of Chartered Chemists of Nigeria. Prominently he is a member of the Governing Council of Institute of Chartered Chemists of Nigeria, where he has been exposed to the internal and external workings of the institute. He also served at various time as the Secretary and later chairman, Abuja Chapter of the Chemical Society of Nigeria where he hosted several national and international chemistry professional events. He has also served as the pioneer Head, Research and Head, Catchment Monitoring Units of the Federal Capital Territory Water Corporation Abuja, Nigeria.

On 1 June 2018, he was appointed as the Registrar/CEO of Institute of Chartered Chemists of Nigeria (ICCON), succeeding Mrs Kujore M. Fowotade as the third substantive Registrar/CEO of the institute.                        

He is a Member of the Scientific Advisory Board, Organization for the Prohibition of Chemical Weapons (OPCW)' and a Member of Nigerian Inter-Ministerial Committee (IMC) on Chemical Weapons Convention and Member of the National Tertiary Health Institutions Standards Committee (NTHISC) of Nigeria. He is also a member of the Governing Council, Chemical Society of Nigeria (CSN).

Awards and honours 
In 2012, he became a Fellow, Chemical Society of Nigeria (CSN), while in 2015, he was appointed as a Chemistry ambassador, American Chemical Society (ACS). In 2018, he was made a Fellow, Institute of Chartered Chemists of Nigeria (ICCON).

References

Living people
1968 births
Nigerian chemists